Scott Thompson (born June 12, 1959) is a Canadian comedian and actor, best known for being a member of the comedy troupe The Kids in the Hall and for playing Brian on The Larry Sanders Show.

Early life
Thompson, born John Scott Thompson, named after his uncle and later changed for the stage, was born in North Bay, Ontario, and grew up in Brampton. He is the second oldest of five boys. He attended Brampton Centennial Secondary School and was a witness to the 1975 Centennial Secondary School shooting. He enrolled at York University but in his third year was asked to leave for being "disruptive". He joined the comedy troupe The Love Cats, where he met Mark McKinney.

Career
In 1984, he became a member of The Kids in the Hall. That troupe's eponymous sketch comedy series aired starting 1989 on the CBC in Canada and on HBO in the United States, but moved to CBS for the fourth and fifth seasons. Openly gay, Thompson became best known on the show for his monologues as the "alpha queen" socialite Buddy Cole, as well as his appearances as Queen Elizabeth II, secretary Cathy, businessman Danny Husk, suburban housewife Fran, actress Francesca Fiore, and as the demented old man in the popular "Love and Sausages" sketch.

Concurrently with The Kids in the Hall, Thompson and his writing colleague Paul Bellini also collaborated in a queercore punk band called Mouth Congress.

During the mid-1990s Thompson ran an interactive website, developed by his younger brother Craig and called . It had a live-chat area, voting and comedy espionage and sold Buddy Cole T-shirts and video tapes of comedy sketches.

He also appeared regularly on The Larry Sanders Show as Hank Kingsley's personal assistant Brian, and made numerous guest appearances on other television series, including Politically Incorrect, The Late Show, Late Night with Conan O'Brien, and Train 48. Thompson hosted a reality television program in Canada called My Fabulous Gay Wedding. Thompson defended Mordecai Richler's novel Cocksure in Canada Reads 2006. He has continued to tour, and act in numerous movies and on TV.  He joined the other Kids in the Hall to tour as recently as 2014, guest-starred in two episodes of Reno 911!, and performed in the project Death Comes to Town (2010) with fellow KITH members Dave Foley, Bruce McCulloch, Mark McKinney, and Kevin McDonald. He had a recurring role in the NBC series Hannibal, playing Jimmy Price, an FBI crime scene investigator.

Thompson published a humor book, Buddy Babylon: The Autobiography of Buddy Cole, and a graphic novel, The Hollow Planet, based on characters from The Kids in the Hall, and has written and performed two one-man shows. In 2014, Thompson, in character as Buddy Cole, did a series of reports on The Colbert Report as the program's correspondent for the 2014 Winter Olympics.

In 2015, Bellini and Thompson uploaded all of their Mouth Congress recordings to Bandcamp, and they reunited the following year for several live shows to promote the release. They launched a Kickstarter campaign to fund a documentary film about the band; that film, Mouth Congress, premiered at the Kingston Canadian Film Festival in 2021.

Around this time, Thompson performed his Buddy Cole monologues at the Portland Queer Comedy Festival.

In 2018, Thompson launched Après le Déluge – The Buddy Cole Monologues, a one-man show in character as Buddy Cole.

Personal life 
Thompson is openly gay.

Firebombing 
In 2000, Thompson was living with his boyfriend, French documentarian Joel Soler, in Hollywood. Soler had smuggled footage out of Iraq to make an E! News-style satiric political documentary comedy, Uncle Saddam, about the eccentricities in the home life of Saddam Hussein and his family, which bubbled behind Hussein's dictatorial façade. Thompson wrote the narration for the movie, which was read by actor Wallace Langham. Following the movie, Thompson and Soler's home was under surveillance by a terrorist group in West Hollywood, who eventually firebombed the couple on November 1, 2000. Thompson has discussed this incident in interviews with Jesse Brown of Canadaland and fellow Canadian comic Elvira Kurt, as being inspiration for his future show The Lowest Show on Earth. In the interview with Kurt, he says of the attack, "We were sleeping and a group came to our home. They filled our giant garbage cans with gasoline and set them on fire on our front lawn. They had buckets of red paint. They covered the house with it so it dripped off like blood. They put a note in the front hall that said, 'In the name of Allah, the merciful and compassionate, burn this Satanic film or you will be dead'. They underlined "dead" just in case we weren't freaked out enough".

This, along with many other incidents throughout Thompson's life, including the 1975 Centennial Secondary School shooting at his Brampton high school, led him to process incidents of terror on micro- and macrocosmic levels through his one-man comedy show The Lowest Show on Earth. Thompson went on tour with this show and secured a spot in New York, off-Broadway. The posters—featuring Thompson lying supine on the ground with a big wad of semen dripping down the side of his face—went up around the city on September 10, 2001. The following day, the terrorist attacks on the World Trade Center made the one-man show's difficult material impossible to talk about.

Health
In March 2009, Thompson was diagnosed with B-cell non-Hodgkin's gastric lymphoma. He completed six rounds of chemotherapy and one month of radiation and is now cancer-free.

Filmography

Film

Television

Other works 
 Buddy Babylon: The Autobiography of Buddy Cole (with Paul Bellini) in 1998, a humor novel; 
 The Lowest Show on Earth, a 2001 one-man show produced in Toronto
 Scottastrophe, 2006 multimedia show
 The Hollow Planet, a graphic novel by Scott Thompson, Kyle Morton, and Stephan Nilson, from IDW Publishing; featuring Thompson's The Kids in the Hall character Danny Husk.

References

External links

1959 births
Living people
Male actors from Ontario
Canadian male film actors
Canadian male television actors
Canadian television personalities
Canadian gay actors
Canadian gay writers
The Kids in the Hall members
Gay comedians
People from Brampton
People from North Bay, Ontario
20th-century Canadian dramatists and playwrights
21st-century Canadian dramatists and playwrights
Canadian graphic novelists
Canadian humorists
Canadian LGBT dramatists and playwrights
Canadian sketch comedians
Canadian male dramatists and playwrights
Canadian male comedians
20th-century Canadian comedians
21st-century Canadian comedians
20th-century Canadian male actors
21st-century Canadian male actors
Comedians from Ontario
Canadian Comedy Award winners
Canadian LGBT comedians
Gay dramatists and playwrights
21st-century Canadian LGBT people
20th-century Canadian LGBT people